Walter Luis Corbo Burmia, known as "Corbo", (born 2 May 1949 in Montevideo) is a former professional footballer. He spent many years with Peñarol and the Uruguay national football team. Corbo also won the Teresa Herrera Cup in 1974 for Peñarol and a second time in 1975.

Born in Montevideo, Corbo began playing professional football with Racing Club de Montevideo before moving to local rivals Peñarol. He played for Grêmio FBPA from 1977 until 1978. Corbo helped Grêmio win the 1977 Campeonato Gaúcho, breaking an eight-year hegemony of Internacional. In the Campeonato Brasileiro, the former goalkeeper appeared in 47 matches, with 25 wins, 15 draws and seven defeats.
In 1979-1980, Corbo played in San Lorenzo de Almagro, of Argentina, before returning to Uruguay to finish his career at River Plate.

Corbo made 11 appearances for the Uruguay national football team from 1971 to 1977.

Corbo now lives in Montevideo, where he works as an entrepreneur in the auto sector.

Honours - International competitions 

 CA Peñarol
 Costa del Sol Cup, Spain: 1975
 Costa del Sol Tournament: 1974, 1975
 "Teresa Herrera Cup": 1974, 1975
 "Mohamed V Cup": 1974
 Transportes Aéreos Portugueses Cup: 1974
 Confraternidad Deportiva Cup: 1973
 Atlántico Sur Cup: 1972, 1973

Honours - Estadual competitions 

 Grêmio FBPA
 Champions of Gaúchão: 1977
 Rio Grande do Sul State Championship: 1977

Honours - National competitions 

 CA Peñarol
 Liguilla: 1974, 1975
 Uruguayan League: 1973, 1974, 1975

References 

1949 births
Living people
Footballers from Montevideo
Uruguayan footballers
Uruguay international footballers
Uruguayan expatriate footballers
Expatriate footballers in Brazil
Expatriate footballers in Argentina
Uruguayan expatriate sportspeople in Brazil
Uruguayan expatriate sportspeople in Argentina
1970 FIFA World Cup players
Uruguayan Primera División players
Argentine Primera División players
Peñarol players
Grêmio Foot-Ball Porto Alegrense players
San Lorenzo de Almagro footballers
Association football goalkeepers